Lestomyia is a genus of robber flies in the family Asilidae. There are about six described species in Lestomyia.

Species
These six species belong to the genus Lestomyia:
 Lestomyia atripes Wilcox, 1937 i c g
 Lestomyia fraudigera (Williston, 1883) i c g
 Lestomyia montis Cole, 1916 i c g
 Lestomyia sabulona (Osten Sacken, 1877) i c g
 Lestomyia strigipes Curran, 1931 i c g b
 Lestomyia unicolor Curran, 1942 i c g
Data sources: i = ITIS, c = Catalogue of Life, g = GBIF, b = Bugguide.net

References

Further reading

 
 
 

Asilidae genera
Articles created by Qbugbot